"Fireworks" is a song by Canadian rock band The Tragically Hip. It was released in November 1998 as the third single from their sixth studio album, Phantom Power. The song was very successful in Canada, peaking at number 9 on Canada's RPM Singles chart.

Content
The song makes references to the 1972 Summit Series (particularly the famous game-winning goal of the series), hockey legend Bobby Orr, and the fitness test administered via the Canada Fitness Award Program.

The narrator appears to be a middle-aged individual, speaking to an unnamed spouse about the history of their relationship. This relationship began on the last night of the Summit Series, and continued through a time-period partly contemporaneous with the remaining years of the Cold War.

The underlying theme of the recollections is that the couple's relationship has managed to survive for a significant number of years, unaffected by, and perhaps even serving as a defense against, external pressures.

Charts

Year-end charts

Pop culture
The song was featured on the season 5 episode 19 of Corner Gas entitled "Final Countdown."

References

1998 singles
The Tragically Hip songs
1998 songs
Universal Music Group singles
Songs based on Canadian history
Songs written by Rob Baker (guitarist)
Songs written by Gord Downie